

Gmina Sobótka is an urban-rural gmina (administrative district) in Wrocław County, Lower Silesian Voivodeship, in south-western Poland. It is part of the Wrocław metropolitan area.

Neighbouring gminas
Gmina Sobótka is bordered by the gminas of Jordanów Śląski, Kąty Wrocławskie, Kobierzyce, Łagiewniki, Marcinowice and Mietków.

Villages
Apart from the town of Sobótka, the gmina contains the villages of Będkowice, Garncarsko, Kryształowice, Księginice Małe, Kunów, Michałowice, Mirosławice, Nasławice, Okulice, Olbrachtowice, Przezdrowice, Ręków, Rogów Sobócki, Siedlakowice, Stary Zamek, Strachów, Strzegomiany, Sulistrowice, Sulistrowiczki, Świątniki, Wojnarowice and Żerzuszyce.

Twin towns – sister cities

Gmina Sobótka is twinned with:
 Berga/Elster, Germany
 Gauchy, France
 Nový Malín, Czech Republic
 Sobotka, Czech Republic

References

Sobotka
Wrocław County